Gwendoline is a feminine given name, a variant of Gwendolen.

Notable people called Gwendoline
Gwendoline Maud Syrie Barnardo (1879–1955), a British interior decorator
Gwendoline Butler (1922-2013), an English writer of mystery fiction
Gwendoline Christie (born 1978), a British actress
Gwendoline Davies (1882–1951), a Welsh patron of the arts
Gwendoline Didier (born 1986), a French figure skater
Gwendoline Eastlake-Smith (1883–1941), a British tennis player
Gwendoline "Gwen" Harwood (1920–1995), an Australian poet
Gwendoline Malegwale Ramokgopa, mayor of the City of Tshwane Metropolitan Municipality, South Africa
Gwendoline Porter (born 1909), a British athlete
Gwendoline Riley (born 1979), an English writer
Gwendoline "Wendy" Wood (1892–1981), a Scottish nationalist and artist
Gwendoline Yeo (born 1977), a Singaporean-American actress and musician

Fictional characters
Gwendoline Mary Lacey, a character in Enid Blyton's Malory Towers series of children's novels (1946–1951)

See also
Guendalina
Gwendolyne
Wendeline (disambiguation)

English feminine given names

ja:グウェンドリン